Sierakowice may refer to:

 Sierakowice, Silesian Voivodeship, a village in Gliwice County, Silesian Voivodeship, Poland
 Gmina Sierakowice, an administrative district in Kartuzy County, Pomeranian Voivodeship, Poland 
 Sierakowice, Pomeranian Voivodeship, the seat of Gmina Sierakowice
 Sierakowice (PKP station), a railway station in Sierakowice, Pomeranian Voivodeship
 Sierakowice-Wybudowanie, a settlement in Gmina Sierakowice
 Sierakowice Prawe, a village in Gmina Skierniewice
 Sierakowice Lewe, a village in Gmina Skierniewice